Dennis Geiger may refer to:

 Dennis Geiger (footballer, born 1984), German footballer
 Dennis Geiger (footballer, born 1998), German footballer

See also
 Geiger